Botrychiopsis is an extinct genus that existed from the Carboniferous to the Permian. Vascularized seedless plants (ferns) and reproduction by spores. They leaf type fronds. They lived in locals humid and swampy.

Location 
In Brazil of the fossil species  B. plantianum was located in outcrop Morro Papalé in the city of Mariana Pimentel. The species  B.  validate  was located in outcrop Quitéria in Pantano Grande. They are in the geopark Paleorrota in Rio Bonito Formation and date from Sakmarian in Permian.

References

Prehistoric plant genera